Takasu Station may refer to:
 Takasu Station (Hiroshima), a railway station in Hiroshima, Japan
 Takasu Station (Kōchi), a tramway station in Kōchi, Japan